Sudan competed at the 2015 African Games held in Brazzaville, Republic of the Congo. The country won one silver medal in athletics.

Medal summary

Medal table

Athletics 

Ali Mohd Younes Idriss won the silver medal in the men's high jump event.

Swimming 

Several swimmers represented Sudan at the 2015 African Games.

References 

Nations at the 2015 African Games
2015
African Games